HMS Thanet was an S-class destroyer of the Royal Navy. Built during, and commissioned shortly after the First World War, she went on to see service in the Second World War, being sunk early in 1942.

Thanet had been one of the ships on the China Station on the outbreak of war. After briefly being converted to a minelayer she spent the early years of the war patrolling off Hong Kong. With the Japanese entry to the war Thanet evacuated Hong Kong with another destroyer, just hours after the Japanese began their attack on the city. She made her way to Singapore and briefly deployed there until being sent to intercept an enemy troop convoy, in company with the Australian destroyer . The allied ships ran into a heavy Japanese force, and after a short battle Thanet was sunk and Vampire was forced to withdraw.

Construction and commissioning
Thanet was ordered from the yards of Hawthorn Leslie & Company, Hebburn in July 1917, part of the 1917–18 Programme. She was laid down there on 13 December 1917 and launched on 5 November 1918, six days before the Armistice with Germany. She was commissioned on 3 August 1919, and was initially used to trial a 'flying off platform' for aircraft.

Second World War
Thanet was on the China Station, deployed with the Local Destroyer Flotilla at Hong Kong on the outbreak of the Second World War on 3 September 1939. Her initial duties involved carrying out patrols and intercepting German shipping, and in October she was nominated to be converted for use as a minelayer. Work began at the naval dockyard in Hong Kong on 18 October, and she was able to participate in the laying of a defensive minefield in Lantau Channel between 21 and 27 October, the following day reverting to her anti-submarine role.

The rest of the year and all of 1940 was spent carrying out similar duties, deploying out of Hong Kong to protect trade and patrol in search of enemy vessels. The threat of the Japanese entry to the war in December 1941 led to negotiations on 6 December between the British commander in the area, Admiral Tom Phillips, and his American counterpart Admiral Thomas C. Hart.

Events were overtaken by the Japanese attack on Pearl Harbor the following day, and the Japanese assault on Hong Kong which began on 8 December, which was effectively the same day as the Pearl Harbour assault for the International Dateline placed Hong Kong twenty-four hours ahead of the USA. Thanet and Scout hurriedly evacuated the port on 8 December, just hours after the Imperial Japanese Army attack on Mainland positions began, and made their way to Singapore to join the Eastern Fleet. A small force consisting of the destroyer , the gunboat  and eight motor torpedo boats remained behind to gallantly fight the Japanese. On their arrival at Singapore on 13 December, Thanet and Scout carried out various escort duties.

Last battle and sinking

On 26 January 1942 Malaya Command received intelligence that a Japanese troop convoy was approaching Endau, and attempted to attack it with nine Lockheed Hudsons of No. 1 and No. 8 Squadrons, and 12 Vickers Vildebeests. The attack went badly, losing five Vildebeests, and being unable to inflict significant damage. The Japanese commander, Vice-Admiral Jisaburō Ozawa had received intelligence reports that two cruisers were at Singapore, and so concentrated his forces off Endau. The two cruisers were in fact Thanet, and the destroyer , and following the failure of the air attacks, Malaya Command ordered them to sea to intercept the convoy. They steamed from Singapore at 4:30 pm on 26 January, carrying only three torpedoes each. Early in the morning of 27 January they ran into the covering force of Japanese warships, consisting of three destroyers, and later being joined by the Japanese cruiser Sendai. Thanet was hit in the engine room and disabled, and began to sink. Vampire attempted to lay down a smoke screen but was driven off under heavy fire, and managed to escape. Thanet sank with the loss of 12 men afterwards. It is believed they were executed in retaliation for heavy Japanese losses sustained in an ambush by the Australian 2/18th Battalion which occurred at the same time as the naval battle off Endau.

See also
 Battle of Singapore

Citations

General references

External links
 HMS THANET - Old S-class Destroyer

 

1918 ships
Maritime incidents in January 1942
S-class destroyers (1917) of the Royal Navy
Ships built on the River Tyne
World War II destroyers of the United Kingdom
World War II shipwrecks in the Pacific Ocean